Atomix may refer to:

 Atomix (video game), a computer puzzle game
 Atomix, a character from the TV show Ben 10: Omniverse

See also
 Atomics (disambiguation)